The term groupie is a slang word that refers to a fan of a particular musical group who follows the band around while they are on tour or who attends as many of their public appearances as possible, with the hope of meeting them. The term is usually derogatory, describing young women who follow these individuals aiming to initiate a sexual encounter with them or to offer them sex. The term is also used to describe fans of sports, and admirers of public figures in other high-profile professions.

Origin in music

The word groupie originated around 1965 to describe teen-aged girls or young women who began following a particular group or band of musicians on a regular basis. The phenomenon was much older; Mary McCarthy had earlier described it in her novel The Company She Keeps (1942). Some sources have attributed the coining of the word to The Rolling Stones bassist Bill Wyman during the group's 1965 Australian tour; but Wyman said he and his bandmates used other "code words" for women on tour.

A prominent explanation of the groupie concept came from Rolling Stone magazine, which published an issue devoted to the topic, Groupies: The Girls of Rock (February 1969), which emphasized the sexual behavior of rock musicians and groupies. Time magazine published an article, "Manners And Morals: The Groupies", later that month. Also that year, journalists Jenny Fabian and Johnny Byrne released a largely autobiographical novel called Groupie (1969). The following year, a documentary film titled Groupies (1970) was released.

Female groupies in particular have a long-standing reputation of being available to celebrities, pop stars, rock stars, and other public figures. Led Zeppelin singer Robert Plant is quoted as distinguishing between fans who wanted brief sexual encounters, and "groupies" who traveled with musicians for extended periods of time, acting as a surrogate girlfriend, and often taking care of the musician's wardrobe and social life. Women who adopt this role are sometimes referred to as "road wives". Cynthia Plaster Caster, Cleo Odzer, Barbara Cope (The Butter Queen) and The GTOs (Girls Together Outrageously), with Pamela Des Barres, in particular, as de facto spokeswoman, are probably the best known groupies of this type.

A characteristic that may classify one as a groupie is a reputation for promiscuity. Connie Hamzy, also known as "Sweet Connie", a prominent groupie in the 1960s, argues in favor of the groupie movement and defends her chosen lifestyle by saying, "Look, we're not hookers, we loved the glamour". However, her openness regarding her sexual endeavors with various rock stars is exactly what has enhanced the negative connotations surrounding her type. For example, she stated in the Los Angeles Times article "Pop & Hiss" (December 15, 2010): "Hamzy, unlike the other groupies, was never looking to build relationships. She was after sex, and she unabashedly shared intimate moments with virtually every rock star—even their roadies—who came through Arkansas."

Des Barres, who wrote two books detailing her experiences as a groupie—I'm with the Band (1987) and Take Another Little Piece of My Heart: A Groupie Grows Up (1993)—as well as another non-fiction book, Rock Bottom: Dark Moments in Music Babylon, asserts that a groupie is to a rock band as Mary Magdalene was to Jesus. Her most recent book, Let's Spend the Night Together (2007), is a collection of wildly varied interviews with classic "old school" groupies including Catherine James, Connie Hamzy, Cherry Vanilla, DeeDee Keel, and Margaret Moser. Des Barres described Keel as: "One of the most intimidating dolls ... a slim strawberry blonde who won the highly prized job of Whisky office manager after her predecessor Gail Sloatman met Frank Zappa and became what we all wanted to be." Keel was one of the few who has stayed connected in Hollywood and with bands for nearly four decades. Des Barres, who married rock singer/actor Michael Des Barres, also persuaded cult actress Tura Satana, singer and model Bebe Buell, actress Patti D'Arbanville, and Cassandra Peterson, better known as "Elvira, Mistress of the Dark", to talk about their relationships with musicians.

Also according to Des Barres' book, there is at least one male groupie, Pleather, who followed female celebrities such as Courtney Love and members of the 1980s pop group The Bangles.

American space program 
During the Mercury, Gemini, and Apollo American space programs in the 1960s, women would hang around the hotels of Clear Lake in Houston, home to many astronauts, and Cocoa Beach in Florida near the rocket launching site at Cape Canaveral, "collecting" astronauts. Joan Roosa, wife of Apollo 14 Command Module Pilot Stu Roosa, recalled, "I was at a party one night in Houston. A woman standing behind me, who had no idea who I was, said 'I've slept with every astronaut who has been to the Moon.' ... I said 'Pardon me, but I don't think so'."

Sports 
Groupies also play a role in sports. A puck bunny is an ice hockey fan whose interest in the sport is primarily motivated by sexual attraction to the players rather than enjoyment of the game itself.  Primarily a Canadian term, it gained popular currency in the 21st century, and in 2004 was added to the second edition of the Canadian Oxford Dictionary which defines it as follows:
Puck bunny: a young female hockey fan, especially one motivated more by a desire to meet the players than by an interest in hockey.

The term is somewhat analogous to the term "groupie" as it relates to rock and roll musicians. Sociological studies of the phenomenon in minor league hockey indicate that self-proclaimed "puck bunnies" are "'proud as punch' to have sex with the [players]", as it confers social status on them. However, these transitory relationships are often contrasted with those of girlfriends, with whom players have more stable, long-term relationships.

"Buckle bunnies" are a well-known part of the world of rodeo. The term comes from a slang term for women ("bunnies"), and from the prize belt buckles awarded to the winners in rodeo, which are highly sought by the bunnies. According to one report, bunnies "usually do not expect anything more than sex from the rodeo participants and vice versa".

In a 1994 Spin magazine feature, Elizabeth Gilbert characterized buckle bunnies as an essential element of the rodeo scene, and described a particularly dedicated group of bunnies who are known on the rodeo circuit for their supportive attitude and generosity, going beyond sex, to "some fascination with providing the most macho group of guys on Earth with the only brand of nurturing they will accept".

Recently, in Irish sport, particularly in Gaelic Athletic Association sports the term "Jersey Puller" or "Jersey Tugger" has been used to describe females who are romantically interested in players. The term refers to the pulling of a player's top. The term can range from who look to be romantically linked with senior intercounty players to local players playing for their parish.

In popular culture

Film 
 Groupies (1970), documentary
 200 Motels (1971), by Frank Zappa about life on the road.
 Almost Famous (2000) depicts groupies who call themselves "band aids".
 The Banger Sisters (2002) depicts two middle-aged women who used to be friends and groupies when they were young.
 School of Rock (2003), referenced when Dewey Finn (Jack Black) (when creating a band and crew composed of prep school students) gives three schoolgirls the roles of groupies, until one of them—Summer Hathaway (Miranda Cosgrove)—learns what a groupie is and is appalled; Dewey subsequently gives her the more important role of band manager.
 Secret Lives of Women: Groupies (2009), a reality television spot featured the Beatle Bandaids (a modern day vintage groupie troupe), Pamela Des Barres, and the Plastics (professional groupies).
 In Woody Allen's movie Midnight in Paris (2011), Gil Pender (Owen Wilson) comments that Adriana is taking the word "art groupie" to a whole new level.

Literature

Music

Groupies 
 The GTOs (Girls Together Outrageously), is a band organized by Frank Zappa in the late 1960s, composed of seven groupies: Miss Pamela (Pamela Des Barres de facto spokeswoman), Miss Sparky (Linda Sue Parker), Miss Lucy (Lucy McLaren), Miss Christine (Christine Frka), Miss Sandra (Sandra Leano), Miss Mercy (Mercy Fontentot), and Miss Cynderella (Cynthia Cale-Binion)

Songs 
 "Pick Me, I'm Clean" and "Road Ladies", both by Frank Zappa.
 On December 16, 2014, KXNG Crooked, a.k.a. Crooked I of Slaughterhouse (Shady Records) released a song called "Groupie" featuring Shalé, produced by Jonathan Hay and Mike Smith from the album Sex, Money and Hip-Hop.
 The song "La Groupie" featured by Reggaetón singers De La Ghetto, Ñejo, Lui-G 21 Plus, Nicky Jam and Ñengo Flow contains explicit vocabulary and expressions for women considered as groupies.
 Michael Jackson's song "Dirty Diana" describes a sexual encounter with a groupie.
 The song "Look Away" by Iggy Pop was written for rock and roll groupie Sable Starr.
 New Riders of the Purple Sage recorded a song titled "Groupie". The chorus goes "She really ain't no groupie/She said so in a movie/At least that's what she said to me."
 Bonnie Bramlett and Leon Russell wrote a song they titled "Groupie", which was recorded by Delaney & Bonnie. The song was covered by The Carpenters under the title "Superstar" and it became one of their most popular hits. Besides the title change, the duo changed the lyric in the second verse from "I can hardly wait to sleep with you again" to the somewhat less suggestive "I can hardly wait to be with you again."
 Grand Funk Railroad recorded their song "We're an American Band", which included the line "Sweet, sweet Connie was doing her act/She had the whole show and that's a natural fact." This lyric is referring to groupie Connie Hamzy.
 Dr. Hook & the Medicine Show recorded the novelty song "Roland the Roadie and Gertrude the Groupie".
 The song "Little Miss Honky Tonk" by Brooks & Dunn praises the singer's girlfriend stating "I wouldn't give her up for a thousand buckle bunnies."
 The song "Star Star" by The Rolling Stones, originally titled "Starfucker", from their album Goats Head Soup (1973) is an infamous, profanity-laden song that speaks candidly of the groupie scene of the early 1970s.
 The song "Groupie Love" by Lana Del Rey, featuring A$AP Rocky off her album Lust for Life (2017), connotes the relationship between an artist with a type of fan—usually a young woman which seeks for emotional or sexual intimacy, involved in obsessive adoration of entertainers such as musicians, actors, athletes, and even political figures.
 The song "Famous Groupies" by the band Wings on the album London Town (1978) tells about a pair of groupies and the damage they leave behind.
 The song "Sick Again" by the band Led Zeppelin on their album Physical Graffiti (1975) is about the L.A. groupie scene in the early 1970s.
 The song "Summer '68" by the band Pink Floyd on their album Atom Heart Mother (1970) was written about keyboardist Richard Wright's encounter with a groupie.
 Stan Rogers described his song "You Can't Stay Here" on his album Northwest Passage (1981) as "[a]n only slightly tongue-in-cheek look at the 'groupie' problem".
 The song "Psycho" by the band System of a Down on their album Toxicity (2001) makes several references to groupies, such as the line "So you want to see the show? You really don't have to be a ho. From the time you were a Psycho, groupie, cocaine, crazy."

Television 
 In Sons of Anarchy, the groupies who hang around the fictional SOA motorcycle club are referred to as "Crow Eaters"; in season 6, Jax's ex-wife Wendy tells Tara, Margaret, and Lowen she was a "Crow Eater" for a year before marrying Jax.

References

External links

 
 
  Article about firefighter and police groupies after 9/11/01.

 
Human sexuality
Women and sexuality
Lifestyles